David Lynn Harbour (born October 23, 1965) is a former American football center in the National Football League for the Washington Football Team.  He played college football at the University of Illinois.

Harbour was signed by the Washington Redskins after former Illinois teammate Mike Scully long snapped two balls over the head of punter Steve Cox in a 20–27 loss against the New York Giants, and was cut the next day.

Harbour also played for the London Monarchs in NFL Europe. He was part of the 1991 NFL Europe Championship team in 1991.  The Monarchs defeated the Barcelona Dragons 21–0.

World Bowl '91 (also referred to as World Bowl I) was the first annual championship game of the World League of American Football. It took place on June 9, 1991 at London's Wembley Stadium. The game featured a matchup between the Barcelona Dragons and the London Monarchs. The Monarchs would win 21–0 in front of 61,108 fans.

Career 

Harbour was featured as a Real Estate expert numerous times on the HGTV show "Get It Sold" with Sabrina Soto.

Personal

References 

2. Redskins Past to Present: David Harbour Redskins.com May 19, 2016

1965 births
Living people
People from St. Charles, Illinois
Players of American football from Illinois
Sportspeople from DuPage County, Illinois
American football centers
Illinois Fighting Illini football players
Washington Redskins players
London Monarchs players